Senator Alden may refer to:

George J. Alden (fl. 1860s), Florida State Senate
Roy Alden (1863–1937), Illinois State Senate